is a railway station in the city of Natori, Miyagi Prefecture, Japan, operated by East Japan Railway Company (JR East). Until the introduction of the Sendai Airport Access Line, it was the most direct point of access to Sendai Airport by a connecting bus service. The bus service still operates.

Lines

Station layout
The station has two opposed side platforms connected to the station building by a footbridge. The station is staffed.

Platforms

History
Tatekoshi Station opened on April 22, 1985. The station was absorbed into the JR East network upon the privatization of the Japanese National Railways (JNR) on April 1, 1987.

Passenger statistics
In fiscal 2018, the station was used by an average of 2,350 passengers daily (boarding passengers only).

Surrounding area
 Tatekoshi Post Office
 Tatekoshi Shrine
Sendai Airport

See also
 List of Railway Stations in Japan

References

External links

  

Railway stations in Miyagi Prefecture
Tōhoku Main Line
Jōban Line
Railway stations in Japan opened in 1985
Natori, Miyagi